Rosina May Lawrence (December 30, 1912 – June 23, 1997) was a British-Canadian actress and singer. She had a short but memorable career in the 1920s and 1930s in Hollywood before she married in 1939 and retired from entertainment. She is best known as the schoolteacher in the Our Gang comedies of 1936-37, and as the ingenue in the Laurel and Hardy feature Way Out West.

Early years 
Born in Westboro, a suburb of Ottawa, Lawrence was the daughter of George Frederick Francis Lawrence, a carpenter, and Annie Louise Hagar, who moved from Ramsgate, England to Ottawa, Ontario, Canada in 1910. George Lawrence found work as a streetcar operator, then as a home builder. 

The family moved to Boston in 1922, then moved to California. In 1925, a fall on a school playground in Los Angeles resulted in paralysis on her left side. Dancing (suggested by a doctor as therapy for her weakened left leg and side) led to professional engagements. 

Lawrence was one of the first women to swim Lake Tahoe in Nevada.

Career
Lawrence's dancing led to work in films when she became Sally Eilers' double for a tap dance in Dance Team. Thereafter, she worked as a stand-in for Eilers in other films and gained dancing roles as well.

Lawrence made her film debut in the 1924 film A Lady of Quality. She received a contract from Twentieth Century-Fox in 1935, her first Fox effort being $10 Raise, an Edward Everett Horton comedy. Her work at Fox was undistinguished, her best-known role there being the ingenue in Charlie Chan's Secret.

Fox loaned her out to comedy producer Hal Roach for the 1936 feature Neighborhood House, ultimately released as a Charley Chase short subject. When her Fox contract was not renewed, she joined the Roach studio full-time, working with Chase, Our Gang, Patsy Kelly, Jack Haley, and Laurel and Hardy. Her singing voice, which had not been featured on film, came to the fore in Laurel and Hardy's Way Out West (1937); in addition to her own vocal, she provided the "high" soprano when Stan Laurel sang "Trail of the Lonesome Pine".

Lawrence showed little interest in promoting her screen career, shying away from the prearranged publicity stunts or photo shoots common to studio press agents. The easygoing Roach staff respected her wishes, and her tenure at Roach ended quietly. Her final performance was in the 1972 Italian comedy film Lost, in which she plays an American film star who causes great excitement when she appears in a small Italian town.

Personal life
Lawrence and Judge Juvenal P. Marchisio married in June 1939, and she left acting to become a housewife. Marchisio died in 1973, and in 1987, Lawrence married John McCabe, a biographer of her onetime co-stars Laurel and Hardy. 

Lawrence's parents became naturalized United States citizens in 1939. Lawrence's nationality was British and it is unclear if she ever became a United States citizen.

Death 
Lawrence died of cancer on June 23, 1997 in New York City, aged 84.

Recognition
In 1936, the Hollywood Press Photographers Association named Lawrence as one of 10 Flashlighters' Starlets — young actresses the group considered most likely to succeed in film careers.

The Nepean Museum has recognized Lawrence by exhibiting publicity photographs and a variety of memorabilia related to her. It also shows a retrospective video of her career and videos of six films in which she appeared.

Selected filmography
The Angel of Broadway (1927)
Welcome Home (1935)
Music Is Magic (1935)
Your Uncle Dudley (1935)
$10 Raise (1935)
Charlie Chan's Secret (1936)<ref>[https://www.youtube.com/watch?v=I3c9y7ZUmA0 Charlie Chan's Secret] (Trailer), 1936, YouTube]</ref>Mr. Cinderella (1936)Arbor Day (1936)General Spanky (1936)On the Wrong Trek (1936)Bored of Education (1936)Two Too Young (1936)Spooky Hooky (1936)Reunion in Rhythm (1937)Hearts Are Thumps (1937)Three Smart Boys (1937)Way Out West (1937)Nobody's Baby (1937)Pick a Star (1937)In the Country Fell a Star'' (1939)

References

External links

 
 

1912 births
1997 deaths
20th-century American actresses
20th Century Studios contract players
Actresses from Ottawa
Deaths from cancer in New York (state)
Hal Roach Studios actors
Metro-Goldwyn-Mayer contract players
Musicians from Ottawa
Our Gang
20th-century Canadian women singers
Canadian expatriate actresses in the United States